Seraphina or Serafina is a given name, and may refer to:

Persons
 Saint Serafina (1238–1253), a thirteenth century Italian saint
 Seraphina Sforza (c. 1434–1478), an Italian noblewoman and nun
 Serafina di dio (1621–1699), Italian abbess
 Penny Serafina Petrone (1925–2005), a Canadian writer, educator, arts patron, and philanthropist
 Serafina Ouistiti, one of the several stage names of Dutch musician Bloem de Ligny (born 1978)
 Serafina Steer (born 1982), an English harpist, pianist, singer and songwriter

Fictional characters
 Seraphina, an 1809 popular novel by Caroline Burney
 Seraphina, a 2012 fantasy novel by Rachel Hartman
 Serafina (Marvel), a super villain in the Marvel Comics Universe
 Serafina Pekkala, a fictional character in Phillip Pullman's His Dark Materials trilogy
 Dona Serafina, a fictional character in Don Rodriguez: Chronicles of Shadow Valley by Lord Dunsany
 Seraphina the Giraffe, a children's story book by Laurent de Brunhoff
 Seraphina Picquery, president of The Magical Congress of the US in the film Fantastic Beasts and Where to Find Them.
 Serafina, protagonist of Serafina and the Black Cloak and its sequels
 Serafina di Miromara, the protagonist in the Waterfire Saga by Jennifer Donnelly
 Seraphina, a major character in the video game Disgaea 5.
 Seraphina au Raa, a character appearing in Iron Gold and Dark Age, books four and five of Pierce Brown's Red Rising Saga.
 Seraphina, coprotagonist of webtoon unOrdinary, by uru-chan.

Places
 Serafina, New Mexico, unincorporated community in New Mexico, United States
 Serafina Corrêa, municipality in the state Rio Grande do Sul, Brazil

See also
 Séraphine (disambiguation), French equivalent
 Séraphin (disambiguation), masculine equivalent
 Serafin (disambiguation)
 Seraph (disambiguation)
 Sarafina! (disambiguation)

Feminine given names
Italian feminine given names